Several special routes of U.S. Route 23 exist. There are 15 extant special routes along U.S. Route 23 and eight former routes, including those in Michigan.

Existing

Waycross business loop

U.S. Route 23 Business (US 23 Bus.) is a  route that goes through downtown Waycross. It is entirely concurrent with US 1 Bus. and State Route 4 Business (SR 4 Bus.). It is signed primarily as US 1 Bus. Except for the far northern end, the entire length of US 23 Bus. is part of the National Highway System, a system of routes determined to be the most important for the nation's economy, mobility, and defense.

Cochran business loop

U.S. Route 23 Business (US 23 Bus.) is an at least  route that goes through downtown Cochran. It is entirely concurrent with State Route 87 Business (SR 87 Bus.).

US 23 Bus./SR 87 Bus.  begins at an intersection south of Cochran, and travels to the northwest. The highway crosses a railroad bridge over a Southern Railway line and becomes Southeast Second Street, traveling through the grounds of the Middle Georgia State University Cochran Campus. After leaving the vicinity of the campus, it eventually intersects SR 26 (Dykes Street), and Southeast Second Street not only becomes Northeast Second Street, but is also shared in a concurrency with US 129 Alternate (US 129 Alt.), and SR 112. The vicinity is also the site of the National Register of Historic Places-listed Cochran Municipal Building and School, and the Bleckley County Courthouse. Between East Ash Street and East Railroad Avenue, the highway curves to the northeast with that same Southern Railway line earlier flanking the west side, although the tracks begin to move away from the road north of unmarked Emergency Route 105. The business route ends at US 23/SR 87, but US 129 Alt. joins the route in a concurrency into Macon, while SR 112 travels concurrently only as far as north into Royal along the same concurrency until branching off towards Milledgeville.

Sylva business loop

U.S. Route 23 Business, established in 1974, is a  route goes through downtown Dillsboro and Sylva, via Haywood Road, Main Street/Mill Street, and Asheville Highway.

Waynesville business loop

U.S. Route 23 Business, established in 1968, is a  route goes through downtown Waynesville, via Hyatt Creek Road, Main Street, and Asheville Road.

Asheville business loop

U.S. Route 23 Business (US 23 Bus), established in 1960, is a  business route (co-signed with US 19 Bus) currently starts on Haywood Road then go north on I-26/I-240 (exit 2) back to the main US 23 (exit 3).  Historically, US 23 Business continued along Haywood Road, connecting to Clingman Avenue and then to Patton Avenue/US 23. In 1961, it extended over Patton Avenue through downtown Asheville when US 23 moved onto the East-West Freeway.  In 1962, it was rerouted to its current alignment from Haywood Road to Hanover Street (now I-26/I-240).

Wolf Laurel alternate route

U.S. Route 23 Alternate (US 23A), established in 2006, is an  route follows the old US 23 route through northern Madison County.  Starting at the exit 9 interchange from I-26/US 23, it briefly links with US 19 before taking a left turn towards Tennessee.  There is no control city for the route as it only connects the communities of California, Faust, and access to the Wolf Laurel gated community and ski resort.  The route reunites with I-26/US 23 at the exit 3 interchange.  Signage of this alternate route goes by an "A" right of number instead of "ALT" or "Alternate" banner on top (this is the same style used by other alternate routes in Western North Carolina).

Gate City business loop

U.S. Route 23 Business (US 23 Bus) is a business route of US 23 in Scott County.  The business route is co-existent with US 58 Business and US 421 Business through Gate City.

Big Stone Gap–Norton business loop

U.S. Route 23 Business (US 23 Bus) is a 16-mile business route of US 23 between the Town of Big Stone Gap, and the City of Norton.

US 23 Bus begins in Big Stone Gap at an interchange along mainline US 23 with US 58 Alternate and Virginia Secondary Route 844, the former of which joins US 23 in an overlap until it reaches Norton Northbound US BUS 23 and westbound US ALT 58 wind around Gilley Avenue East until it reaches East 5th Street South, then turns north. At Wood Avenue East (SR 610), US ALT 58 turns west, ending the concurrency, and the name changes to East 5th Street North. The route crosses a bridge over the Powell River then after passing a local car dealership across from East 5th Avenue becomes Roaring Branch Road. Most of this mountainous road winds around the Powell River, the Norfolk Southern Appalachia District, and an abandoned L&N railroad line currently in the process of being converted into a rail trail. The route turns more towards the east as it enters Appalachia, Virginia where it is renamed West Main Street, and serves as the eastern terminus for Virginia State Route 68. The road name is changed to East Main Street after the southern terminus of Virginia State Route 78 a bridge over the NS Clinch Valley Extension, and then follows the rest of the line east. Leaving town, the road is named Kent Junction Road, and at SR 603 where it passes a bridge over the junction the road was named for which also contains the Paradise Branch. The street name still remains after passing this junction, and along the way it passes the Central Drive-In Theatre just before passing through Blackwood, Virginia.

Descending from the mountains, the area becomes slightly more developed as it passes by the NRHP-listed Country Cabin community center, and through a forgotten unincorporated community named Josephine. East of SR 621 the route officially enters Norton, Virginia, and the street is named Park Avenue Northwest. Within downtown Norton, the road encounters U.S. Route 58 Alternate Business at 11th Street Southwest, and is joined by that route in an overlap. Continuing to run straight east through the city, it encounters the Western terminus of Virginia State Route 74 at Coeburn Avenue Southwest, which runs southeast of the routes. East of VA 74 the routes climb an embankment and becomes a divided highway, though the US Bus 23/Alt-Bus 58 overlap is about to come to an end. Just before the interchange with mainline US 23, US ALT-BUS 58 continues east straight ahead along unmarked Virginia State Route 283 (Norton Coeburn Road) while US BUS 23 and Park Avenue Northeast make a sharp turn to the north. From this point on, the route is a two-lane highway with a continuous center left-turn lane, winding around the west side of the Guest River, and the Norfolk Southern Glamorgan Branch. Snaking closer to the railroad and the river, it leaves the Norton City Limits at the intersection with SR 620 and the Glamorgan Branch at the same time, just before crossing a bridge over the Guest River where the street is named Esserville Road. US BUS 23 ends at the intersection of US 23 across from SR 757 (Wise-Norton Road).

Wise business loop

U.S. Route 23 Business (US 23 Bus) is a business route of US 23 in the Town and County of Wise, Virginia. The route runs along Norton Road and West Main Street.

Pound business loop

U.S. Route 23 Business (US 23 Bus) is a business route of US 23 in Pound, also in Wise County. Most of the business route is co-existent with SR 83, except for a portion that runs along Main Street between SR 83 and US 23.

Pikeville business loop

U.S. Route 23 Business (US 23 Business) was a business route of Pikeville, Kentucky. Like the business route between Paintsville and Prestonburg, it ran in concurrently with U.S. Route 460 Business. The route began at a diamond interchange shared by the eastern terminus of KY 1384 and ran east where it eventually curved south and west around into downtown Pikeville. US BUS 23/460 ended at an interchange with US 23/460.

Paintsville business loop

U.S. Route 23 Business (US 23 Business) was a business route in Paintsville, Kentucky and Prestonburg, Kentucky. Much of the route ran in a concurrency with U.S. Route 460 Business, as well as Kentucky Route 40, Kentucky Route 321, and Kentucky Route 114.

Ashland business loop

U.S. Route 23 Business (US 23 Business) is a business route of US 23 in Ashland, Kentucky. The route runs parallel to the mainline US 23 about a block to the west.

Major intersections

Portsmouth truck route

U.S. Route 23 Truck (US 23 Truck) is a truck route of US 23 between South Portsmouth, Kentucky, and Portsmouth, Ohio. The route overlaps Kentucky Route 8 (KY 8), and KY 8S to the Carl Perkins Bridge where it then overlaps Ohio State Route 852 (SR 852) until it turns east along U.S. Route 52 in Ohio and finally terminates in Downtown Portsmouth at US 23 along a one-way pair of southbound Chillicothe Street and northbound Gay Street.

Major intersections

Chillicothe business loop

U.S. Route 23 Business (US 23 Business) is a business route of US 23 in Chillicothe, Ohio. The route begins at an interchange at mainline US 23 and County Route 205, (Three Locks Road), which is also the northern terminus with the overlap of mainline US 23 and OH 104. Three Locks Road becomes South River Road, taking US 23/OH 104 with it as the route runs parallel to the Norfolk Southern Railroad Columbus District until it passes the intersection with Southern Avenue, and curves away from the tracks before entering the city limits. At US 50, OH 104 makes a left turn overlapping that route, and US BUS 23 continues north onto OH 159 (North Bridge Street). US BUS 23 and OH 159 cross a bridge over the Scioto River then runs under an interchange with US 35. Curving in a northeasterly direction, the route passes under the CSX Northern Subdivision. US BUS 23 terminates at another interchange with mainline US 23, while OH 159 continues northward towards the Lancaster area.

Former

Hazlehurst business loop

U.S. Route 23 Business (US 23 Bus.) was a business route of US 23 that existed completely within the city limits of Hazlehurst. It was completely concurrent with SR 19 Bus. It traveled along East Jefferson Road and then turned onto US 221/SR 135, which traveled northbound along South Cromartie Street and southbound along South Tallahassee Street until they reached US 23/US 341/SR 19/SR 27. In 1986, the path of US 23/SR 19 in the city was shifted eastward. Its former path, including the concurrent path of US 221/SR 135, was redesignated as SR 19 Bus. The next year, US 23 Bus. was established on the path of SR 19 Bus. In 1995, both US 23 Bus. and SR 19 Bus. were decommissioned. The portion not concurrent with US 221/SR 135 was redesignated as SR 135.

Baldwin–Cornelia business route

U.S. Route 23 Business in Cornelia, Georgia existed between 1972 and circa 1992, along part of Georgia State Route 105.

Waynesville alternate route

U.S. Route 23 Alternate in Waynesville existed between 1939 and 1968.

Canton alternate route

U.S. Route 23 Alternate near Canton  existed between 1962 and 1971.  In its short history, it was utilized simply as a connector route to a completed section of I-40, west of Asheville.

Asheville alternate route

U.S. Route 23 Alternate in Asheville existed between 1949 and 1960.  Today, the route is known as US 23 Business.

See also

References

External links

23
23
23
U.S. Route 23
23